Time Capsule: A Future Retrospective is a box set by American electronic rock band Julien-K. It is a four-disc collection of previously rare or unreleased material, including b-sides, demos, rough mixes, remixes, and live recordings.

Background
The 64-track four-disc set was first announced in May 2017 via Facebook. As with the band's previous two albums an Indiegogo campaign was launched in order to finance the project, and as with previous campaigns their $15,000 goal was reached within a day, ultimately finishing the campaign with $50,520.

Track listing

Disc One: Unreleased Songs & Studio B-Sides

Disc Two: Demos

Disc Three: Live & Acoustic

Disc Four: Rough Mixes, Remixes & Live

Personnel
Julien-K
Ryan Shuck – vocals, guitar
Amir Derakh – guitar, bass guitar, synthesizer, G-Synth, programming
Anthony 'Fu' Valcic – programming, synthesizer, bass guitar

Additional musicians
James Kinney - organ on track 1 (disc one); programming, synthesizer on tracks 1, 8 (disc one), track 6 (disc four); keys on track 6 (disc four)
Brandon Belsky - programming, bass on track 4 (disc one), track 11 (disc two); keys, backing vocals on tracks 1-6 (disc three)
Eric Stoffel - programming, synthesizer on track 9 (disc one), tracks 14-16 (disc two), tracks 15-17 (disc three)
Eli James - drums on tracks 13-15 (disc one), tracks 7-9 (disc three)
Brian Spangenburg - fretless bass on track 1 (disc two)
Jamey Koch - EFX guitar on track 10 (disc two)
The Z-Listers - programming, synthesizer on track 12 (disc two), track 7 (disc four)
Guy Hatfield - synthesizer on track 13 (disc two)
Elias Rodriguez - drums on tracks 1-6 (disc three), tracks 13-16 (disc four); percussion on tracks 12-14 (disc three)
Chester Bennington - additional vocals on tracks 10-11 (disc three)
Amber Snead - additional vocals on tracks 12-17 (disc three)
Maestro Rhythm King - beatbox on tracks 12-14 (disc three)
Ricardo 'Ricky' Restrepo - v-drums on tracks 15-17 (disc three)

References

Julien-K albums
2018 compilation albums
2018 live albums
B-side compilation albums